Ab Rokhan (also Romanized as Āb Rokhān, Āb-e Rokhān, and Ābrakhān) is a village in Garmsar Rural District, Jebalbarez-e Jonubi District, Anbarabad County, Kerman Province, Iran. At the 2006 census, its population was 195, in 34 families.

References 

Populated places in Anbarabad County